Balša Radunović (born 12 August 1992) is a Montenegrin volleyball player and a member of Montenegro men's national volleyball team. He is currently playing in Spain’s Superliga de Voleibol Masculina for CAI Teruel. In 2016, he won the Super Cup with CV Teruel and placed 2nd place in the King’s Cup - Spanish Super League, while being the best scorer in the final match.

Professional career
Achievements
 2008 - 2011: Won Championship of Montenegro 3 times and won Cups 2 times
 2011: Champions league knockout phase with Budvanska Rivijera
 2012: Final Cup of Italy and Final of Championship with Segrate, Italy
 2014: Won Gold Medal in EuroLeague with National Team of Montenegro
 2015: Final 4 of Arab Champions League with Darkulaib, Bahrain
 2015: 2nd place in World League with National Team of Montenegro
 2016: Won Championship of Saudi Arabia – Al Hilal Saudi Arabia
 2017: Won Super Cup of Spanish Super League – CAI Teruel 
 2017: 2nd place in King’s Cup (best scorer in final match) – Spanish Super League, CAI Teruel

External links
 Balsa Radunovic at the International Volleyball Federation
 

1992 births
Living people
Montenegrin men's volleyball players
Expatriate volleyball players in Italy
Expatriate volleyball players in Greece
Expatriate volleyball players in Spain